Laurie Reed (22 May 1936 – 21 May 2018) was a British middle-distance runner. He competed in the men's 1500 metres at the 1960 Summer Olympics.

References

1936 births
2018 deaths
Athletes (track and field) at the 1960 Summer Olympics
British male middle-distance runners
Olympic athletes of Great Britain